James Cantion was a London Irish rugby union player.

Olympics
In 1900 he was a member of the Moseley Wanderers RFC who represented Great Britain & Ireland in the 1900 Olympic Games.

Britain was one of three teams to compete in the first Olympic rugby games. Britain lost its only game, against France. The game against Germany was cancelled due to travel plans.

References

External links

London Irish players
Rugby union players at the 1900 Summer Olympics
Year of death missing
Year of birth missing
Olympic athletes of Great Britain